Legislative elections were held in São Tomé and Príncipe on 26 March 2006.

Parties and Coalitions
Eight political parties and two coalitions contested the election.

Movement for the Liberation of São Tomé and Príncipe-Social Democratic Party (MLSTP-PSD) – Largest party in the outgoing National Assembly, winning 24 out of 55 seats in the March 2002 election.
Force for Change Democratic Movement–Democratic Convergence Party (MDFM-PCD) – Two party coalition that won 23 seats in the 2002 election. The coalition was formed in late 2001 by supporters of President Fradique de Menezes.
Ue-Kedadji (UK) – A five party coalition that won 8 seats in the 2002 election. The coalition's member parties are the Democratic Renovation Party (PRD), National Union for Democracy and Progress (UNDP), Opposition Democratic Coalition (CODO), People's Party of Progress (PPP), and the Social Renewal Party (PSR).
Independent Democratic Action (ADI) – Contested the 2002 election as part of the Uê Kédadji coalition, but has since withdrawn and will participate in this year's poll as a single entity.
São Toméan Workers Party (PTS) – Participated in the 2002 election, but failed to gain representation in the National Assembly.
Christian Democratic Front (FDC) – Small party that participated in the 1991, 1994, and 1998 National Assembly elections. In all three elections, the party won less than 2% of the vote.
Social Liberal Party (PLS) – Newly formed political party.
New Way Movement (NR) – Newly formed political party.

Results

References

Elections in São Tomé and Príncipe
Sao Tome
2006 in São Tomé and Príncipe
March 2006 events in Africa